Karna Limbu is a Nepali international football player and he plays for the National League side Jhapa XI. Despite being one of the most consistent goalscorers in the Nepalese leagues many fans believe that he deserves to play for the national team more regularly.

He currently plays for the Jhapa XI and also played for Machhindra FC last season in the Redbull A-Division League of Nepal.

Club career

Machhindra
In the second to last game of the 2014 Martyr's A League second division Limbu scored a late goal over Sankata Boys Sports Club which made him top scorer of the league with 11 goals and cemented second place for Machhindra.

Jhapa XI
In January 2015 along with several other former Machhindra players Limbu signed with Jhapa XI for the upcoming 2015 Nepal National League.

International career
Limbu came on as a 75-minute substitute for Anil Gurung in a match against Yemen on 25 March 2014 in an eventual 2-0 defeat.

Limbu was excluded for Nepal's next match against the Philippines in April 2014. Even more controversially Limbu was not included in the two world cup qualification against India in March 2015 despite being in the best inform striker in Nepal at the time.

In December 2015 it was announced that coach Patrick Aussems had cut Limbu and three other players from the squad for the 2015 SAFF Championship, yet again denying Limbu that chance to play for Nepal on the big stage.

Personal life
Limbu hails from Chandragadhi in Jhapa District, and is the youngest of four boys. He met his future wife Bal Kumari after the latter was impressed by the former's skill at a local tournament. Together with Kumari whom he married when he was 20 he has two daughters.

References

Year of birth missing (living people)
Living people
People from Jhapa District
Nepalese footballers
Nepal international footballers
Association football forwards
Machhindra F.C. players